The Bolgarchay (Bolqar çay in Azerbaijani, بالهارود Bālhārūd in Persian), is a river, forming part of the Azerbaijan–Iran border.

Description
The Balharud rises from Oujarud Mountains near Siya (a small village on the Iranian-Azerbaijan border). It is joined by its tributaries including the Salala in Azadli, the Hamzakhanli in Tapabashi, the Germi in Hadibeyli and the Barzand in Beygbaghili; all flowing from the Iranian side of its catchment area. It  flows along the Iranian-Azerbaijani border, and then along a corridor that connects Turkey to Azerbaijan's Nakhchivan exclave. It then flows along the Iranian-Azerbaijani border and leaves Iran at Bilesavar to enters Azerbaijan proper. It pours into Mahmud-Chaleh Lake.

References

Rivers of Azerbaijan
Rivers of Iran
Azerbaijan–Iran border
International rivers of Asia
Border rivers